Vyacheslav Lukhtanov (born 12 February 1995) is a Ukrainian football defender who most recently played for Cherkashchyna.

Career
Lukhtanov is a product of the FC Dynamo youth sportive school. His first trainers were Oleksandr Shpakov and Yevhen Rudakov.

He spent his career in the Ukrainian First League club FC Dynamo-2 Kyiv. And in February 2015 went on loan for FC Hoverla in the Ukrainian Premier League.

References

External links
Profile at Official FFU Site (Ukr)

1995 births
Living people
People from Lutuhyne
Ukrainian footballers
Association football defenders
Ukraine youth international footballers
Ukrainian expatriate footballers
Expatriate footballers in Belarus
Ukrainian expatriate sportspeople in Belarus
Ukrainian Premier League players
FC Dynamo Kyiv players
FC Dynamo-2 Kyiv players
FC Hoverla Uzhhorod players
FC Helios Kharkiv players
NK Veres Rivne players
FC Olimpik Donetsk players
FC Smolevichi players
FC Cherkashchyna players
Sportspeople from Luhansk Oblast